The men's triple jump event  at the 1986 European Athletics Indoor Championships was held on 23 February.

Results

References

Triple jump at the European Athletics Indoor Championships
Triple